Minuscule 2757 (in the Gregory-Aland numbering), is a Greek minuscule manuscript of the New Testament, written on 266 parchment leaves (26.5 cm by 18.7 cm). Palaeographically it has been assigned to the 12th century (or 13th).

Description 
The codex contains the complete text of the four Gospels. The text is written in one column per page, in 26-27 lines per page. The titles are written in semi-uncials or uncials, and mostly in red (faded). Zeta formed like the rounded number 3. Title in Mark is written red semi-uncial letters, in rest of the Gospels in red uncial letters. It contains the Ammonian Sections, a references to the Eusebian Canons, synaxarion, and menologion. It used the nomina sacra written in an abbreviated form.

Kurt Aland the Greek text of the codex did not place in any Category.
According to the Claremont Profile Method it has Mix/Kmix/Kx.

History 

The codex now is located in the Kenneth Willis Clark Collection of the Duke University (Gk MS 38)  at Durham.

See also 

 List of New Testament minuscules
 Biblical manuscripts
 Textual criticism

References

Further reading 

 Clark Kenneth Willis, "Greek New Testament Manuscripts in Duke University Library", Library Notes, no. 27 (April 1953), pp. 6-7.

External links 

 Minuscule 2757 at the Kenneth Willis Clark Collection of Greek Manuscripts 

Greek New Testament minuscules
12th-century biblical manuscripts
Duke University Libraries